Robert Emmett O'Neill (January 13, 1918 – October 11, 1993), was an American professional baseball player and former Major League Baseball pitcher. He played with the Boston Red Sox, Chicago Cubs and the Chicago White Sox. He batted and threw right-handed during his baseball career. He attended college at Saint Mary's College of California.

Career

O'Neill made his Major League debut with the Boston Red Sox on August 3, 1943. He played his final game on June 5, 1946 with the Chicago White Sox. He had two career shutouts and an ERA of 4.76.

O'Neill died on October 11, 1993 in Sparks, Nevada at the age of 75 from coronary artery complications. He is buried at St Michael Church, Marquette, Michigan.

External links

Baseball Library

1918 births
1993 deaths
Baseball players from California
Boston Red Sox players
Chicago Cubs players
Chicago White Sox players
Danville Leafs players
Greensboro Red Sox players
Louisville Colonels (minor league) players
Major League Baseball pitchers
Rocky Mount Red Sox players
Sacramento Solons players
San Francisco Seals (baseball) players
Saint Mary's Gaels baseball players
Scranton Red Sox players
Shreveport Sports players
Toronto Maple Leafs (International League) players
People from San Mateo, California
Saint Mary's College of California alumni